Umrao Singh Yadav  (21 November 1920 – 15 January 2005) was an Indian recipient of the Victoria Cross (VC), the highest and most prestigious award for gallantry in the face of the enemy that can be awarded to British and Commonwealth forces.  He was a non-commissioned officer in the Royal Artillery or the Royal Indian Artillery to be awarded the Victoria Cross during the Second World War, and the last survivor of only 40 Indian soldiers to be awarded the VC between 1912, when Indians first became eligible to be awarded the VC, to Indian independence in 1947.

Early life
Umrao Singh Yadav, son of Mohar Singh, was born into a Hindu Ahir family in Palra, a small village in Jhajjar district in Haryana (then the Rohtak district of undivided Punjab), 50 km north of Delhi.

He attended a local school and joined the Indian Army during World War II in November 1939.  He was promoted to Havildar (Sergeant) in the Royal Indian Artillery, Indian Army in 1942.

Award
On the night of 15 to 16 December 1944 in the Kaladan valley, Burma, Umrao Singh was a field gun detachment commander in an advanced section of the 33 Mountain Battery, 30th Mountain Regiment, Indian Artillery, serving on detachment as part of the 81st West African Division in Viscount Slim's British 14th Army, supporting the advance of the XV Corps on the Arakan.  Singh's gun was in an advanced position, supporting the 8th Gold Coast Regiment.  After a 90-minute sustained bombardment from 75 mm guns and mortars from the Japanese 28th Army, Singh's gun position was attacked by at least two companies of Japanese infantry. He used a Bren light machine gun and directed the rifle fire of the gunners, holding off the assault. He was wounded by two grenades.

A second wave of attackers killed all but Singh and two other gunners, but was also beaten off. The three soldiers had only a few bullets remaining, and these were rapidly exhausted in the initial stages of the assault by a third wave of attackers. Undaunted, Singh picked up a "gun bearer" (a heavy iron rod, similar to a crow bar) and used that as a weapon in hand-to-hand fighting.  He was seen to strike down three infantrymen, fatally wounded, before succumbing to a rain of blows.

Six hours later, after a counter-attack, he was found alive but unconscious near to his artillery piece, almost unrecognisable from a head injury, still clutching his gun bearer.  Ten Japanese soldiers lay dead nearby and seven critically wounded. His field gun was back in action later that day.

Later life
Singh was presented with his VC by King George VI at Buckingham Palace on 15 October 1945.  The citation reads "Havildar Umrao Singh set a supreme example of gallantry and devotion to duty."

He was promoted after recovering from his wounds.  He retired from the British Indian army in 1946, but rejoined the army in 1947 following independence. On 1 February 1950, Singh was promoted to the junior commissioned officer rank of jemadar (equivalent to the present-day rank of naib subedar). He was promoted to subedar major on 2 May 1968, and to the honorary rank of captain on 15 August 1970. After leaving the army a second time, he returned to farm his family's 2 acre (8,000 m2) smallholding.

At the celebrations of the 50th anniversary of VE Day in London in 1995, he was almost turned away from the VIP tent because his name was not on the correct list, but Brigadier Tom Longland, who had organised the event, recognised his medal and gave orders for him to be admitted.  After the event, Singh complained to British Prime Minister John Major about the meagre pension of £168 per year paid to the then ten surviving Indian VC holders.  The amount had remained fixed since 1960, but Major subsequently arranged for the pension to be raised to £1,300 per year. He was awarded the Padma Bhushan in 1983.

He attended the service of dedication of the Victoria Cross and George Cross Memorial in Westminster Abbey on 14 May 2003. In his book 'Toward Resurgent India', Lt. Gen. (Retd.) M. M. Lakhera, PVSM, AVSM, VSM writes:

After being diagnosed with prostate cancer in July 2005, he died, at the Army Research and Referral hospital in New Delhi on his 85th birthday, 21 November 2005.  He was cremated in his native village with full military honours, attended by Bhupinder Singh Hooda (Chief Minister of Haryana), General Joginder Jaswant Singh (Army Chief), and Lt Gen Charanjit Singh (Director General of Artillery). His wife, Vimla pre-deceased him, but he was survived by two sons and a daughter.

In spite of personal hardship and receiving substantial offers, Singh refused to sell his medal during his lifetime, saying that selling the medal would "stain the honour of those who fell in battle".

His name was the last one to be added to the memorial of Victoria Cross winners of the Royal Artillery in the apse of St George's Garrison Church in Woolwich, London, near the Royal Artillery Barracks.

Awards

References

VC winner bid farewell with full military honours, Outlookindia.com, 21 November 2005
 Last Indian Victoria Cross winner dies, The Hindu, 22 November 2005
Obituary, The Times, page 60, 22 November 2005.
 Obituary, The Telegraph, 22 November 2005.
Obituary, The Independent, 24 November 2005.

External links
Umrao Singh 
VC citation

1920 births
2005 deaths
Deaths from prostate cancer
Indian World War II recipients of the Victoria Cross
Indian Army officers
British Indian Army officers
People from Jhajjar
Deaths from cancer in India
Recipients of the Padma Bhushan in civil service
Indian Army personnel of World War II